Chee Wan Hoe (born 9 December 1971) is a Malaysian former footballer. He formerly played with Perak FA and Penang FA.
He also the former member of Malaysia Olympic Team (Malaysia U-23) in 1991.

Career
Wan Hoe is one of the longest serving player for Penang FA. He help the team to win the 1998 and 2001 Malaysia Premier League I. In 2002, he helped Penang to win their first Malaysia FA Cup title by beating his former team Perak. On the next season, he clinch the Charity Shield with Penang.

Wan Hoe retired from professional football after the 2007 season ended. He was the longest serving team captain for Penang FA.

Honours

Penang FA
 Malaysia Premier 1 League: 1998, 2001
 Malaysia FA Cup: 2002
 Malaysia Charity Shield: 2003

References

Malaysian footballers
Malaysian people of Chinese descent
Living people
1971 births
Penang F.C. players
Perak F.C. players
Association football defenders